Carl Hartmann may refer to:

 Carl Friedrich Alexander Hartmann (1796-1863), German mineralogist and mining engineer
 Carl Hartmann (footballer) (1894–1943), German footballer 
 Carl Hartmann (sculptor) (1837–1901), Danish sculptor
 Carl Wilhelm Hartmann (1880–1957), Norwegian public prosecutor, judge and politician

See also 
 Carl Hartman (disambiguation)